Abdul Samad (born 28 October 2001) is an Indian cricketer who plays for Jammu & Kashmir in domestic cricket and for Sunrisers Hyderabad in the Indian Premier League (IPL). He is a right-handed batsman and right-arm leg-break bowler.

Samad is the third cricketer from Jammu & Kashmir to feature in the IPL. He made his IPL debut against Delhi Capitals on 29 September 2020.

Career
He made his Twenty20 debut for Jammu & Kashmir in the 2018–19 Syed Mushtaq Ali Trophy on 21 February 2019. He made his List A debut on 27 September 2019, for Jammu & Kashmir in the 2019–20 Vijay Hazare Trophy. He made his first-class debut on 9 December 2019, for Jammu & Kashmir in the 2019–20 Ranji Trophy.

He was signed by the Sunrisers Hyderabad for the 2020 Indian Premier League. He made his IPL debut on 29 September 2020, against the Delhi Capitals. He was retained by the franchise in the IPL 2022 auction.

References

External links
 

2001 births
Living people
Indian cricketers
Jammu and Kashmir cricketers
Sunrisers Hyderabad cricketers
People from Rajouri district